ESO 593-8, which is known simply as 'The Bird' (also ESO 593-IG 008 or IRAS 19115–212) is group of interacting galaxies located in the constellation of Sagittarius, 650 million light-years away from Earth. It was created by a merger of two spiral galaxies and an irregular dwarf-galaxy. The resulting galaxy has a size similar to the Milky Way: around 100,000 light years. The galaxies were imaged by the Hubble Space Telescope and released in April 2008. The European Southern Observatory has also used the Very Large Telescope to resolve fine details of the galaxy with the use of adaptive optics.

References 

 
Sagittarius (constellation)
Spiral galaxies
Interacting galaxies